is a Japanese multinational corporation, headquartered in Tokyo, Japan, producing electronic devices, including switches, potentiometers, sensors, encoders and touchpads.

The company was established in 1948 as Kataoka Electric Co., Ltd. and changed its name to Alps Electric Co., Ltd. in December 1964. Since June 22, 2012, the President has been Toshihiro Kuriyama and Chairman is Masataka Kataoka. Alps is also well known for the Alpine brand of car audio.

The Alps Electric Group has R&D, production and sales bases located in Japan and around the globe—in the Americas, Europe, Southeast Asia, Korea, and Greater China. Since its founding, Alps Electric has supplied around 40,000 types of electronic components to over 2,000 manufacturers of home appliances, mobile devices, automobiles and industrial equipment worldwide.

Alps Group comprises 84 subsidiary companies, 25 through Alps Electric, 32 through Alpine Electronics and 27 through Alps Logistics.

The company is listed on the Tokyo Stock Exchange and a constituent of the Nikkei 225 stock index.

The company changed company name to Alps Alpine Co., Ltd. in January 2019.

Business divisions
Alps Automotive division focuses on provision of custom products and modules, including control panels and steering modules, for specific vehicle models, and components compatible with any vehicle.

Alps Home and Mobile divisions focuses on provision of switches, potentiometers, sensors, and other components through to multi-input devices like touch panels and GlidePoint™ to home, mobile and PC markets. Alps Electric focuses on human-machine and machine-machine interfaces for home appliances, mobile devices and PCs.

Alps Industry, Healthcare & Energy divisions focuses on provision of a wide variety of products, including sensors, power inductors, switches and communication modules, to industry, healthcare and energy markets.

Alps touchpad hardware is developed and manufactured by the Cirque Corporation, which they acquired in 2003;  however, the parent company continues to write their own drivers. Their drivers are Windows certified. They are mostly found in Sony, Toshiba and Dell notebooks, as well as the OLPC XO-1. They also manufacture keyboards for Apple computers, including the original Macintosh and the first iMac.

Business integration and name change 
On January 1, 2019, Alps Electric Co., Ltd. and Alpine Electronics, Inc. integrated the two businesses together under the new name of Alps Alpine Co., Ltd..  Alpine Electronics, Inc. became a wholly owned subsidiary of Alps in 1978 when Alps acquired all shares of Alps Motorola Inc.

Gallery

See also 

 List of mechanical keyboards
 Cherry

References

External links 
  Wiki collection of bibliographic works on Alps Electric

Electronics companies of Japan
Manufacturing companies based in Tokyo
Companies listed on the Tokyo Stock Exchange
Manufacturing companies established in 1948
Japanese brands